The Right Time is the seventeenth studio album by Etta James, released in 1992.

Track listing

Personnel
Etta James - vocals
Lucky Peterson - organ, guitar
Steve Cropper - guitar
Steve Winwood - vocals on "Give It Up"
Hank Crawford - alto saxophone
Gary Armstrong - trumpet
Frank Crawford - synthesizer
Steve Ferrone - drums
Roger Hawkins - drums
David Hood - bass guitar
Jim Horn - baritone saxophone
Clayton Ivey - piano
Doug Bartenfeld - guitar
Jay Johnson - guitar
Jimmy Johnson - guitar
Marie Lewey - backing vocals
Will McFarlane - guitar 
Cindy Richardson Walker - backing vocals
Tom Roady - percussion
George Soulé - backing vocals
Harvey Thompson - tenor saxophone
Willie Weeks - bass guitar
Kirk "Jelly Roll" Johnson - harmonica
Mike Haynes - trumpet

References

1992 albums
Etta James albums
Albums produced by Jerry Wexler
Elektra Records albums